Saiful Islam Mannu is a Bangladeshi film director. He won Bangladesh National Film Award for Best Screenplay for the film Putro (2018). As of 2018, he directed 600 television episodes, 60 telefilms, 28 one-hour dramas, two feature films and several  documentaries.

Career
In 2012 Mannu debuted in film direction through Charulata,  a digital film to celebrate the 151st birth anniversary of Rabindranath Tagore on the adapted story, Noshto Nir.

Mannu was the director, screenwriter and lyricist of the film Putro (2018).

Personal life
Mannu is married to Sadia Shabnam Shantu. She won the Bangladesh National Film Award for Best Costume Design for the Putro film.

Works
 Shwapnoloker Deshey (2005)
 Khuje Berai Taare (2006)
 Amar Bou Shob Janey (2008)
 Forgive Me (2012)
 Chaar Deyaler Kabbyo (2012)
 Hoihoi Roiroi (2013)
 Karo Kono Neeti Nai (2013)
 Bheja Bheja Brishtite (2014)
 Cholo Hariye Jai (2015)
 Putro (2018)

References

External links
 

Living people
Bangladeshi film directors
Bangladeshi screenwriters
Bangladeshi lyricists
Best Screenplay National Film Award (Bangladesh) winners
Year of birth missing (living people)
Place of birth missing (living people)